The Peruvian meadowlark (Leistes bellicosus) is a species of bird in the family Icteridae.
It is found in western Peru, Ecuador and far northern Chile.

Its natural habitats are subtropical or tropical dry shrublands, subtropical or tropical high-altitude shrublands, intertidal marshes, and pasturelands all around 1,000 metres above sea level.

The males are streaky brown with a bright red throat and chest. The females are duller in colour and are more streaked than the males. They grow to be 20 cm long and are characterised by their bobbing flight which is similar to that of a woodpecker.  They eat mostly insects, but sometimes eat seeds.

References

External links
Range of the Peruvian meadowlark - Oiseaux.net

Peruvian meadowlark
Birds of Ecuador
Birds of Peru
Peruvian meadowlark
Peruvian meadowlark
Taxonomy articles created by Polbot